Dwier Brown (born January 30, 1959) is an American actor. In the 1989 film Field of Dreams he played John Kinsella, the father of Kevin Costner's character (in reality, he is four years younger than Costner), and he played Henry Mitchell in Dennis the Menace Strikes Again in 1998. Brown has appeared in several horror films, such as House (1986) and The Guardian (1990), the latter directed by William Friedkin, who also directed The Exorcist. He has also made appearances on several television series, including Firefly, Criminal Minds, and Ghost Whisperer.  In 2014, he wrote a memoir titled If You Build It... described as a book about "fathers, fate, and Field of Dreams."

Early life 
Brown was born on January 30, 1959, in Wadsworth, Ohio. He graduated from Ashland University, in Ashland, Ohio.

Selected filmography 

 The Member of the Wedding (1982, TV Movie) – Jarvis
 The Thorn Birds (1983, TV Mini-Series) – Stuart McCleary, adult
 To Live and Die in L.A. (1985) – Doctor
 Copacabana (1985, Tv Movie) – Bibi Sutton
 House (1986) – Lieutenant
 Tic Tac Dough (TV 1986) contestant on final six shows
 House II: The Second Story (1987) – Clarence
 Field of Dreams (1989) – John Kinsella
 The Guardian (1990) – Phil Sterling
 The Cutting Edge (1992) – Hale Forrest
 Galaxies Are Colliding (1992) – Adam
 Mom and Dad Save the World (1992) – Sirk
 Revenge on the Highway (1992, TV Movie) – Red Robin
 Quantum Leap (1992, TV Series) – Neil Walters
 Gettysburg (1993) – Capt. Brewer
 Without Warning (1994, TV Movie)–– Matt Jensen
 Goldilocks and the Three Bears (1995) – Hal
 Same River Twice (1996) – Mikey
 Dennis the Menace Strikes Again (1998) – Henry Mitchell
 Rip Girls (2000, TV Movie) – Ben Miller
 Reunion (2001) – Patrick
 The Zeros (2001) – Leo
 Falling Like This (2001) – Deputy Sheriff
 Red Dragon (2002) – Mr Jacobi
 Firefly (2003, Episode: "Trash") – Durran Haymer
 Criminal Minds (2006, TV Series) – William Copeland
 The Unit (2007, TV Series) – Ambassador Blashek
 Fast Girl (2008) – Bill Johnstone
 Crazy (2008) – Businessman in busy
 We Shall Remain: Tecumseh's Vision (2009) – William Henry Harrison
 The Intervention (2009) – Matthew Garret
 Freedom Riders (2009, TV Series)
 Ghost Whisperer (2010, TV Series) – Jeff
 CSI: Crime Scene Investigation (2010, TV Series) – Young Sam Braun
 Locked Down (2010) – Kirkman
 Private Practice (2012, TV Series) – Matthew
 Ironside (2013, TV Series) – Carter Watson
 Rizzoli & Isles (2016) – Priest

References

External links 
 

1959 births
Living people
20th-century American male actors
21st-century American male actors
American male film actors
American male television actors
Ashland University alumni
Male actors from Ohio
People from Summit County, Ohio
People from Wadsworth, Ohio